Moortown Golf Club is a golf club located in Alwoodley, near Leeds, England. It was founded in 1909, and the championship golf course was designed by Dr Alister MacKenzie.

Moortown hosted the Ryder Cup in 1929.  About two thousand spectators saw America gain a narrow lead before the Great Britain team won singles on the final day and thus the competition by a score of 7–5 points.

During the 1980s Moortown was a regular stop on the European Tour, hosting the Tournament Players Championship in 1980 and the Car Care Plan International from 1984 to 1986. The club has also hosted qualifying rounds for The Open Championship as well as being the venue for the English Amateur four times, and the Brabazon Trophy on five occasions.

Tournaments hosted

Ryder Cup

European Tour

Amateur

* – Event reduced to 54 holes because of adverse weather.

References

External links

Moortown Golf Club official website

Ryder Cup venues
Golf clubs and courses designed by Alister MacKenzie
Golf clubs and courses in Yorkshire
Sport in Leeds
Sports clubs established in 1909